PACKS is the second studio album by American rapper Your Old Droog. It was released on March 10, 2017 through Droog Recordings under exclusive license to Fat Beats Records. The fourteen-track record featured guest appearances by the likes of Detroit-based rapper Danny Brown, actor and comedian Anthony Jeselnik, Wiki from Ratking, Chris Crack, Heems, and Edan.

Track listing 
Track listing adapted from bandcamp and iTunes.

Notes
  signifies a co-producer

Personnel 
Vocalists

 Your Old Droog – vocals (tracks: 1, 3-5, 7-9, 11-14)
 Anthony Jeselnik – voice (tracks: 2, 6, 10)
 Himanshu Kumar Suri – vocals (track 4)
 Daniel Dewan Sewell – vocals (track 5)
 Chris Crack – vocals (track 7)
 Patrick Morales – vocals (track 9)
 Edan Portnoy – vocals (track 9)

Technicals

 Your Old Droog – producer (tracks: 1, 4-5, 8-9, 11, 13), executive producer
 Peter Mudge – producer (track 1)
 Eric "E. Dan" Dan – producer (tracks: 1, 5)
 Lawrence Lord – producer (track 3)
 El Richard Moringlane – producer (tracks: 4, 7-8, 13)
 Edan Portnoy – producer (tracks: 9, 11)
 Charles Misodi Njapa – producer (track 12)
 Alan Maman – producer (track 14)
 Dan "The Man" Humiston – recording
 Eddie Sancho – mixing
 Joe LaPorta – mastering

References 

2017 albums
Fat Beats Records albums
Albums produced by 88-Keys
Albums produced by the Alchemist (musician)